Eril Maxine Homburg (16 October 1936 – 16 December 2017) was an Australian women's basketball player.

Biography
Homburg represented South Australia at basketball. She played in every match for the Australian team at the 1957 FIBA World Championship for Women, hosted by Brazil.

Personal life
She married John Drennan, a South Australian cricketer who toured New Zealand and South Africa with the Australian team in the 1950s.

References

1936 births
2017 deaths
Australian women's basketball players